Big Brother Africa 6 (also known as Big Brother Africa: Amplified) was the sixth season of the reality television series Big Brother Africa produced by Endemol for M-Net which began airing on 1 May 2011 and ran for 91 days until 31 July 2011. This year Mnet co-partnered with Coca-Cola for the season. Ikponmwosa "IK" Osakioduwa came back to host the show for the third time in a row. The launch show was also broadcast live through the official website. This year the contestants will move into a brand new house. South African band BLKJKS (Blackjacks) performed their song 'Mzabalazo'; Busta Rhymes also performed during the 2 hour launch show.

Format
There were twenty six housemates this season and lived in the same house (Heads House) for one week. On Day 7, eleven of the twenty six moved to a different house (Tails House) during the live eviction show. The housemates were competing for US$400,000. On Day 42, it was announced that there were going to be two winners who will each receive US$200,000. This year, fourteen countries participated in the season. Each country had at least one representative for them. All fourteen countries were returning countries and these were Angola, Botswana, Ethiopia, Ghana, Kenya, Malawi, Mozambique, Namibia, Nigeria, South Africa, Tanzania, Uganda, Zambia and Zimbabwe.

Housemates
On Day 1, twenty six housemates entered the House on launch night.

Twists

Fuse
This season, a twist known as the Fuse took place since Day 35. The Fuse was a punishment that was given to housemate(s) for a week until the live eviction show. The fuses were given to them by the evicted housemates. The Fuse is similar to the "Molotov Cocktail" in season 4 and the "Dagger" in season 5.

Nominations table

Notes

Voting history

  Survivor(s) of the vote.

Nominations and voting notes

Week 1
On Day 1, the twenty six housemates entered Heads House during the launch for the first week of the season. However, Big Brother announced that it was audition week for all housemates. They performed various tasks to show if they are worth the game.

On Day 7 during the live eviction show, it was announced that all housemates passed the auditions and were all given a real chance to compete. All twenty six housemates joined IK on stage during the live eviction show. IK announced that fifteen of the twenty six will return to the Heads House while the remaining eleven will go to a secret house (Tails House). They each had to pick a card that will determine the house they will stay in.

The fifteen housemates that returned to the Heads House were Bernadina, Confidence, Danny, Felicia, Hanni, Jossy, Lomwe, Michael, Millicent, Sharon O, Vimbai, Vina, Wendall, Weza and Zeus.The eleven housemates that moved to the Tails House were Alex, Bhoke, Ernest, Karen, Kim, Lotus, Luclay, Mumba, Nic, Nkuli and Peo.

Week 2
On Day 8, nominations occurred in the Heads House.

The initial nominees were Confidence, Danny, Jossy, Vina, Weza and Zeus.Head of House, Zeus decided to save himself and replace himself with Vimbai.Therefore, Confidence, Danny, Jossy, Vimbai, Vina and Weza were up for eviction for the week.

This week, viewers voted for the housemate they wanted to save and these were the results:
Weza received 6 votes to save: Angola, Botswana, Malawi, South Africa, Tanzania and Zambia.
Vina received 3 votes to save: Nigeria, Uganda and Rest of Africa.
Vimbai received 3 votes to save: Kenya, Mozambique and Zimbabwe.
Confidence received 1 vote* to save: Ghana.
Danny received 1 vote* to save: Ethiopia.
Jossy received 1 vote* to save: Namibia.

*The tie-breaker rule applied to Confidence, Danny and Jossy where the number of votes for the housemate were divided by the 15 regions to get the average percentage. Jossy had the lowest average percentage.

On Day 14, Jossy was evicted while Danny moved to the Tails House.

Week 3
On Day 15, nominations occurred in the Tails House.

The initial nominees were Karen, Kim, Luclay and Nkuli.Head of House, Peo decided to save Karen and replace her with Mumba.Therefore, Kim, Luclay, Mumba and Nkuli were up for eviction for the week.

On Day 19, Big Brother ejected Lotus for slapping Luclay on the face.

This week, viewers voted the housemate they wanted to save and these were the results:
Luclay received 8 votes to save: Angola, Botswana, Ethiopia, Ghana, Namibia, Nigeria, South Africa and Rest of Africa.
Kim received 5.5 votes to save: Kenya, Malawi, Mozambique*, Tanzania, Uganda and Zambia.
Mumba received 1.5 votes to save: Mozambique* and Zimbabwe.
Nkuli received no votes to save.

*Kim and Mumba shared a vote from Mozambique.

On Day 21, Nkuli was evicted.

Week 4
On Day 22, nominations occurred in the Heads House.

The initial nominees were Bernadina, Confidence, Hanni, Sharon O and Vina.Head of House, Vimbai decided to save Hanni and replace her with Michael.Therefore, Bernadina, Confidence, Michael, Sharon O and Vina were up for eviction for the week.

This week, viewers voted for the housemate they wanted to save and these were the results:
Vina received 6 votes to save: Angola, Botswana, Ethiopia, Nigeria, South Africa and Rest of Africa.
Sharon O received 6 votes to save: Kenya, Malawi, Tanzania, Uganda, Zambia and Zimbabwe.
Confidence received 1 vote* to save: Ghana.
Bernadina received 1 vote* to save: Namibia.
Michael received 1 vote* to save: Mozambique.

*The tie-breaker rule applied to Bernadina, Confidence and Michael where the number of votes for the housemate were divided by the 15 regions to get the average percentage. Michael had the lowest average percentage.

On Day 28, Michael was evicted while Bernadina moved to the Tails House.

Week 5
On Day 29, nominations occurred in the Tails House.

The initial nominees were Bhoke, Ernest and Luclay.Head of House, Danny decided to save Luclay and replace him with Peo.Therefore, Bhoke, Ernest and Peo were up for eviction for the week.

This week, viewers voted for the housemate they wanted to save and these were the results:
Peo received 10 votes to save: Angola, Botswana, Ethiopia, Ghana, Malawi, Mozambique, Namibia, Nigeria, South Africa and Rest of Africa.
Ernest received 3 votes to save: Kenya, Uganda and Zimbabwe.
Bhoke received 2 votes to save: Tanzania and Zambia.

On Day 35, Bhoke and Ernest were evicted.

Week 6
On Day 36, nominations occurred in the Heads House.

The initial nominees were Confidence, Felicia, Hanni, Millicent, Vina, Weza and Zeus.Head of House, Lomwe decided to save Felicia and replace her with Vimbai.Therefore, Confidence, Hanni, Millicent, Vimbai, Vina, Weza and Zeus were up for eviction for the week.

This week, viewers voted for the housemate they wanted to save and these were the results:
Vimbai received 5 votes to save: Mozambique, Namibia, Tanzania, Zambia and Zimbabwe.
Hanni received 3 votes to save: Ethiopia, Malawi and South Africa.
Vina received 2 votes to save: Nigeria and Rest of Africa.
Millicent received 2 votes to save: Kenya and Uganda.
Zeus received 1 vote* to save: Botswana.
Weza received 1 vote* to save: Angola.
Confidence received 1 vote* to save: Ghana.

*The tie-breaker rule applied to Confidence, Weza and Zeus where the number of votes for the housemate were divided by the 15 regions to get the average percentage. Confidence had the lowest average percentage.

On Day 42, Confidence was evicted while Weza moved to the Tails House.

Week 7
On Day 43, nominations occurred in the Tails House.

The initial nominees were Alex, Danny, Kim, Luclay and Nic.Head of House, Alex decided to save himself and replace himself with Karen.Therefore, Danny, Karen, Kim, Luclay and Nic were up for eviction for the week.

This week, viewers voted for the housemate they wanted to save and these were the results:
Karen received 6 votes to save: Angola, Ghana, Mozambique, Namibia, Nigeria and Rest of Africa.
Kim received 4 votes to save: Malawi, Tanzania, Zambia and Zimbabwe.
Luclay received 2 votes* to save: Botswana and South Africa.
Nic received 2 votes* to save: Kenya and Uganda.
Danny received 1 vote to save: Ethiopia.

*The tie-breaker rule applied to Luclay and Nic where the number of votes for the housemate were divided by the 15 regions to get the average percentage. Nic had the lowest average percentage.

On Day 49, Danny and Nic were evicted.

Week 8
On Day 50, nominations occurred on the Heads House.

The initial nominees were Hanni, Lomwe, Millicent, Sharon O, Vimbai, Vina, Wendall and Zeus.Head of House, Vina decided to save herself and replace herself with Felicia.Therefore, Felicia, Hanni, Lomwe, Millicent, Sharon O, Vimbai, Wendall and Zeus were up for eviction for the week.

This week, viewers voted for the housemate they wanted to save and these were the results:
Hanni received 5 votes to save: Angola, Ethiopia, Ghana, Nigeria and Rest of Africa.
Wendall received 3 votes to save: Namibia, Zambia and Zimbabwe.
Zeus received 2 votes to save: Botswana and South Africa.
Lomwe received 2 votes to save: Malawi and Mozambique.
Vimbai received 1 vote to save: Tanzania.
Sharon O received 1 vote to save: Uganda.
Millicent received 1 vote to save: Kenya.
Felicia received no votes to save.

On Day 56, Felicia was evicted while Millicent moved to the Tails House.

Week 9
On Day 57, nominations were supposed to occur in the Tails House, but Big Brother decided surprise the housemates. He called the Heads Housemates to the Diary Room one by one and never returned to the house. Instead, they were placed in several rooms of the Tails House. This indicated that the houses have officially merged and the housemates are now staying in the Tails House.

Due to the merge, there was no eviction since nominations didn't take place.

Week 10
On Day 64, nominations occurred. The initial nominees were Alex, Karen, Peo, Sharon O and Weza.Head of House, Karen decided to leave the nominations as they were.Therefore, Alex, Karen, Peo, Sharon O and Weza were up for eviction for the week.

This week, viewers voted for the housemate they wanted to save and these were the results:
Karen received 8 votes to save: Angola, Mozambique, Namibia, Nigeria, South Africa, Zambia, Zimbabwe and Rest of Africa.
Sharon O received 3 votes to save: Kenya, Malawi and Uganda.
Weza received 2 votes to save: Ethiopia and Tanzania.
Alex received 1 vote to save: Ghana.
Peo received 1 vote to save: Botswana.

On Day 70, Peo, Alex and Weza were evicted.

Week 11
On Day 71, nominations occurred.

The initial nominees were Bernadina, Lomwe, Vina, Wendall and Zeus.Head of House, Vimbai decided to save Wendall and replace him with Mumba.Therefore, Bernadina, Lomwe, Mumba, Vina and Zeus were up for eviction for the week.

This week, viewers voted for housemate they wanted to save and these were the results:
Lomwe received 5 votes to save: Kenya, Malawi, Mozambique, Tanzania and Uganda.
Vina received 4 votes to save: Ethiopia, Ghana, Nigeria and Rest of Africa.
Mumba received 3 votes to save: Angola, Zambia and Zimbabwe.
Zeus received 2 votes to save: Botswana and South Africa.
Bernadina received 1 vote to save: Namibia.

On Day 77, Bernadina, Zeus and Mumba were evicted.

Week 12
On Day 78, nominations occurred.

The initial nominees were Hanni, Karen, Kim, Luclay, Millicent, Vimbai and Wendall.Head of House, Vina decided to save Karen and replace her with Lomwe.Therefore, Hanni, Kim, Lomwe, Luclay, Millicent, Vimbai and Wendall were up for eviction for the week.

This week, viewers voted for the housemate they wanted to save and these were the results:
Luclay received 5 votes to save: Angola, Botswana, Ghana, South Africa and Rest of Africa.
Hanni received 2 votes* to save: Ethiopia and Nigeria.
Wendall received 2 votes* to save: Namibia and Zimbabwe.
Lomwe received 2 votes* to save: Malawi and Mozambique.
Millicent received 2 votes* to save: Kenya and Uganda.
Kim received 1 vote to save: Zambia.
Vimbai received 1 vote to save: Tanzania.

*The tie-breaker rule applied to Hanni, Lomwe, Millicent and Wendall where the number of votes for the housemate were divided by the 15 regions to get the average percentage. Millicent had the lowest average percentage.

On Day 84, Vimbai, Kim and Millicent were evicted.

Week 13
Hanni, Karen, Lomwe, Luclay, Sharon O, Vina and Wendall were the finalists of the season. The final seven were competing for the grand prize of US$200,000 each for two housemates.

This week, viewers voted for the housemate they wanted to win and these were the results:
Karen won the season with 6 votes to win: Angola, Ghana, Mozambique, Nigeria, Tanzania and Rest of Africa.
Wendall also won the season with 4 votes to win: Kenya, Namibia, Zambia and Zimbabwe.
Luclay finished in 3rd place with 2 votes to win: Botswana and South Africa.
Lomwe finished in 4th place with 1 vote to win: Malawi.
Sharon O finished in 5th place with 1 vote to win: Uganda.
Hanni finished in 6th place with 1 vote to win: Ethiopia.
Vina finished in 7th place with no votes to win.

Karen and Wendall won 2011's Amplified season after getting the most votes with 6 and 4 country votes respectively.

Trivia
>>Jossy, Michael, Confidence and Felicia are the only BB Amplified housemates who never entered the Tails House.

Controversy
There was controversy about the voting and auditing process after M-Net did not produce proper voting results on day 42. This led to people concluding that the whole show was planned and viewers were fooled that they were the ones influencing voting results as they thought M-Net and Endemol were influencing the game to gain more profits.

Mnet released the clarified results audited and verified by Ernst & Young the following day after the controversy.

Ernest and Bhoke (the couple dubbed "EBhok") were hugely criticised for having sex in the Big Brother house.
There was controversy surrounding Luclay's punishment as it was not done accordingly. The punishment involved Luclay taking over all dish washing duties for as long as he is part of the Big brother show. This was not done and viewers felt that it was not fair since Lotus was evicted because of the same confrontation with Luclay.

References

External links
 Big Brother Africa 6 at M-Net
 Big Brother Africa Official Fan Site on BigBrotherAfrica.com
 Big Brother Africa Highlights on Ugandaonline.net

2011 South African television seasons
06